The South Korean government, under the regime of Park Chung-hee, took an active role in the Vietnam War. From September 1964 to March 1973, South Korea sent some 350,000 troops to South Vietnam. The South Korean Army, Marine Corps, Navy, and Air Force all participated as an ally of the United States. The number of troops from South Korea was much greater than those from Australia and New Zealand, and second only to the U.S. military force for foreign troops located in South Vietnam. The military commander was Lieutenant General Chae Myung-shin of the South Korean army.

Participation of Korean forces in the war included both non-combatant and combatant roles.

Causes

President Lyndon Johnson made a formal request to South Korea for noncombatant troops on May 1, 1964; South Korea had been offering military assistance in 1954, beginning a year after the Korean Armistice Agreement. President Dwight D. Eisenhower rejected the previous offers because American public opinion would not support an American military presence in South Korea if the South Korean troops were fighting in Vietnam. President John F. Kennedy rejected the previous offers because he hoped for the situation in Vietnam would not deteriorate to the point that South Korean troops were needed. President Johnson, in contrast, adopted foreign participation in the war as a key component in the American strategy for Vietnam.

Eventually, a request for coalition partners by MACV under the Many Flags campaigns was made, and South Korea joined the war. South Korea would make up the second largest force in the ten member coalition after the United States.

From a state level, South Korea's decision to join resulted from various underlying causes, including the development of US-South Korea relations, political exigencies, and the promise of economic aid from the United States. On the individual level, Korean soldiers saw themselves as repaying the sacrifices Americans had made during the Korean War. Many also saw an economic opportunity for combat pay and took on service to support their families.

Role
The first Korean units arrived in February 1965, in a brigade group known as Dove Force. These included engineers, a medical unit, military police, a navy LST, liaison staff, and other support personnel. Dove Force was deployed to the Biên Hòa region of South Vietnam, and helped build schools, roads and bridges. Medical teams are reported to have treated over 30,000 South Vietnamese civilians. The civilian operations in the early southern part of the campaign are reported to have had some success. In addition to combat and non-combat forces, South Korea had sent around 100,000 civilian workers to South Vietnam, employed in technical and civilian tasks.

In 1966 Korean combat forces were deployed to the Tuy Hòa valley and taking over security operations, where there was some positive evaluations of ROK's operational capability. They are alleged to have inflicted 24 to 1 casualties during one operation in 1966.

At the start of the Tet Offensive they were transferred to the Da Nang and Quảng Nam Province region.

State Department reports that though they were seen as effective in combat in the initial years, had withdrawn to the coast and were reluctant to undertake offensive operations. A passive role was not limited to just the Koreans; other armies including ANZAC and US forces were also kept at minimal combat following the Tet Offensive. Part of the reason for this was the US announcement of withdrawal following political failures revealed by Tet, which caused the Korean military to lose reason, the Korean military's assessment received favourable reviews in the beginning and was passive in the second half.  The withdrawal process had negatively impacted Korean-US relations, despite economic benefits gained, with Nixon and Secretary of Defense Melvin Laird considering simultaneous withdrawal from both Korea and Vietnam.

In 1969 the South Korean army accounted for 9% of the foreign troops stationed in South Vietnam (US Army 475,200, ROK Army 49,755); by the end of 1972, they comprised 60.5% of foreign troops (US Army 24,200, ROK Army 37,438). US Marine Aviation assets that supported the Blue Dragon troops withdrew completely in May 1971 while the combat role of Korean troops continued. As Vietnamization progressed the U.S, had to consider keeping support units in South Vietnam to support the two ROK Divisions. Around the time of the Battle of An Khe Pass, ROK forces had more limited air-support, but remained until 1973 when all foreign troops withdrew due to the Paris Peace Accords. The U.S. considered convincing the South Korean government to keep one of the divisions in South Vietnam into 1974 given the slow progress of development of Army of the Republic of Vietnam (ARVN) units in the area.

Evaluation
American war planners are alleged to have leaned heavily on ROK forces, given their ability to carry out missions with considerable success. Koreans often outperformed other allied forces in Vietnam in lethality, organization, and professionalism. Other commanders were more critical and stated "Koreans made excessive demands for choppers and artillery support and that they stood down for too long after an operation.

As a component of the joint-service MACV, the South Korean Marines had a great deal of interaction with American Marines.  While the Vietnam War constituted the first military action on foreign soil for the South Korean marines since their formation, they claimed to have proven themselves to be highly skilled and capable warriors. All of the Blue Dragon Brigade's officers were trained in Quantico, Virginia or San Diego, California by the U.S. Marine Corps. In the Vietnam War, South Korean marines lacked organic aviation assets and American ANGLICO Marines were typically embedded within every South Korean company to coordinate fires, close air support, medevac, and resupply.

Overall, assessments of the ROK military vary greatly over time. The tactics of the ROK military changed from defensive and passive tactics including the establishment of siege-like bases, unlike aggressive tactics prior to the Tet Offensive. This passivity became even worse since the US 7th Division withdrew from South Korea. Since one of the reasons for participation was due to fears of US withdrawal from South Korea, when the United States was planning on reducing the number of US troops on the Korean Peninsula later on, public opinion and government opinion declined, and they became less willing to participate. Other U.S. data generally positively assess the military activities of the Korean military.

Non-combat and civilian support operation in the southern areas were well received. The South Korean military emphasized active support for civilians. During the Vietnam War, the South Korean military provided 3,353,364 public health services, 1,640 tons of food, 461,764 points of clothing, 6,406 farm tools, and 3,319 bridges This hearts and minds campaign received positive reporting.

South Koreans tried to support the cooperative civilians around the base, but the civilians in the town where Viet Cong was active were seen by Koreans as enemies, not civilians. This was particularly noticeable in the northern areas where the Vietcong was very active. In other cases the Korean military and in particular engineering, medical and construction units has put a great deal of effort into helping the people.

Impact within South Korea

The U.S. paid for the financial costs associated with South Korean troops in Vietnam; promised not to withdraw American troops from South Korea without prior consultation with the South Korean government; helped modernize the South Korean army; provided substantial military aid to South Korea; and gave economic aid to South Korea, including a $150 million development loan. The average salary for Korean servicemen in Vietnam was $37.50 per month, higher than the base pay of $1.60 per month back home although much of it was taken by the South Korean government. The economic aid South Korea received from the U.S. was used to fund South Korea's industrialization efforts. For some of South Korea's largest conglomerates, they can attribute their subsequent success and growth to the lucrative business contracts awarded to them by the U.S. military. The total cost to the United States of paying for Korean participation was "peanuts compared to what it would be for a comparable number of Americans," but those payments are estimated to account for 4 percent of the GNP in 1967 and totalling more than one billion dollars.

The wartime alliance between the U.S. and South Korea stabilized Park Chung-hee’s regime, creating both short- and long-term effects for South Korea. South Korea’s economic success deterred the appeal and threat of communism domestically, furthering the stability of Park’s rule. Park took advantage of the alliance and used it to implement authoritarian policies in South Korea.  He arrested his opposition, implemented martial law, and amended the constitution to allow himself to serve a third presidential term, bolstering the power of his regime. The U.S. tolerated his undemocratic policies to ensure the stability of South Korea.

Under the wartime alliance, the South Korean economy flourished, receiving tens of billions of dollars in grants, loans, subsidies, technology transfers, and preferential economic treatment.

Because of the alliances the U.S. had with Japan and South Korea, the U.S. played an important role in normalizing relations between South Korea and Japan, which brought long-lasting economic benefits to South Korea, receiving financial support from Japan and access to the Japanese economy.

The Korean government refused to provide additional compensation for their war veterans by establishing a "no duplicate reward" in the Constitution. Korean victims of Agent Orange have also not received compensation from the Korean government.

There are allegations of missing POWs from Korea. A total of 320,000 troops have been deployed, but only eight people have been officially recognized by the Korean government so far as missing in action. There are suspicions that the South Korean government intentionally ignored South Korean POWs captured by the North Vietnamese. It was believed that some of them were forcibly sent to North Korea, with the South Korean government concluding that at least two captured soldiers had been moved there, being forced to deliver speeches on North Korean Radio.

War crimes and atrocities
Various civilian groups have accused the South Korean military of war crimes, while the Korean Ministry of Defense has denied all such accusations.

Korean forces are alleged to have perpetrated the Binh Tai, Bình An/Tây Vinh, Bình Hòa, and Hà My massacres. Further incidents are alleged to have occurred in the villages of An Linh and Vinh Xuan in Phú Yên Province.

In 1972, Vietnamese-speaking American Friends Service Committee members Diane and Michael Jones looked at where Korean forces operated in Quảng Ngãi and Quảng Nam Provinces and alleged they had conducted 45 massacres, including 13 in which over 20 unarmed civilians were purportedly killed. The Phong Nhị and Phong Nhất massacre is confirmed to have taken place within these two provinces.  A separate refugee study by RAND employee Terry Rambo, reported in a 1970 New York Times story, conducted interviews in early to mid 1966 in Phu Yen Province which confirmed that widespread atrocities had occurred.  These included systemic mass-killings and deliberate policies to massacre civilians, with murders running into the hundreds.

The Associated Press (AP) in April 2000 investigated the purported Bình An/Tây Vinh massacre and stated that it "was unable to independently confirm their [the Vietnamese victims'] claims" and "an additional 653 civilians were allegedly killed the same year by South Korean troops in neighboring Quang Ngai and Phu Yen provinces, according to provincial and local officials interviewed by the AP on a trip the government took two months to approve. As is routine with foreign reporters, several government escorts accompanied the AP staff. The AP was unable to search for documents that would back up the officials' allegations". The AP wrote that "neither the Pentagon nor the South Korean Defense Ministry would comment on the allegations or offer independent confirmation". A Reuters story from January 2000 stated that:

When Korean forces were deployed to I Corps in 1968, U.S. Marine General Rathvon M. Tompkins stated that "whenever the Korean Marines received fire or think [they got] fired on from a village... they'd divert from their march and go over and completely level the village. It would be a lesson to [the Vietnamese]". General Robert E. Cushman Jr. stated several years later that "we had a big problem with atrocities committed by them which I sent down to Saigon." presumably in reference to the Phong Nhị and Phong Nhất massacre.

Koreans have claimed that atrocities committed by their forces stemmed from orders by Park Chung-hee to minimise casualties through practices such as hostage-taking.  Furthermore, the brutality of South Korean measures was due to many officers being Japanese-trained and implementing the same doctrines during the Korean War.

Punishment for some war crimes did occur. The Korean Army responded to the case of General Seo Kyung-seok, decorated for winning a victory but found to have beaten a prisoner, by revoking his award.

Atrocities first reported in the 1990s by Ku Su-jeong had shocked Korean society. These reports came just as the newly democratized South Korea was facing pressures from civic groups to recognize the mass killings of South Korean civilians by ROK forces during the Korean War such as the Bodo League massacres. Further testimonies and extensive accounts in the South Korean media emerged from South Korean Vietnam War veterans, and have caused considerable debate and re-assessment within South Korea about its role in the conflict. Korean civil groups have discussed the issue considerably, and calls have been made for a Korean inquiry, in line with the Truth and Reconciliation Commission on massacres committed by government forces during the Korean War, known as the People's Tribunal on War Crimes by South Korean Troops during the Vietnam War.

South Korean civic groups have created a statue on Jeju Island dedicated to Vietnam War victims at a site commemorating victims of the Jeju uprising.

Impact on South Korea and Vietnam relations 

The issue of war crimes has not been an aspect of foreign relations between the governments of Korea and Vietnam both when the countries were opening up relations and to the present day, unlike the role historical issues have played in Korean-Japanese relations. Much of this issue is instead driven by civic groups in both countries. In April 2020, a survivor of the Phong Nhi massacre alongside the Korea-Vietnam Peace Foundation filed a civil lawsuit in the court of South Korea against the Korean government in an effort to have a fact-finding mission convened. The Korean Defense Ministry in its response has stated that its own records do not support allegations of the lawsuit, and has called for a joint investigation by the Korean and Vietnamese governments. Survivors of the Phong Nhi massacre have also traveled to South Korea to give accounts of events to various groups.

Apologetic statements from President Kim Dae-jung and Moon Jae-in have been given, short of a full public apology. Apologies for war crimes has become a political issue within South Korean politics, as President Moon Jae-in had planned on making a unilateral official apology but stopped short due to widespread opposition from prominent conservatives within South Korea. The recent political interest in South Korea for an official apology is contextualized within the ongoing trade war and diplomatic rifts between Japan and Korea over a South Korean court having ordered compensation for forced labor from a Japanese company.

The issue is rarely acknowledged or discussed by the Vietnamese government or state-controlled media following normalization of relations, though in a rare statement the Vietnamese government did oppose the "commemoration of mercenaries" when South Korean President Moon Jae-in honoured the 50th Anniversary of South Korean servicemen who had fought in South Vietnam on South Korea's Memorial Day in 2017.

The issue around children conceived through wartime affairs and rape known as Lai Dai Han remains, like controversies around comfort women. Civic groups in Vietnam have campaigned for recognition of the issue and an apology by the Korean government. Most were ostracised and neglected by Vietnamese society following the war. Lai Dai Han and their families faced mistreatment following North Vietnam's victory for allegedly siding with opposing forces, including one rape victim's father being beaten to death by the communist regime shortly after the war ended. Both the Korean and Vietnamese governments have sidelined or ignored this issue, and requests by the BBC to make a documentary was turned down by the Vietnamese government.

Order of battle 

 Capital Division (Tiger)
 9th Infantry Division (White Horse)
 1st Airborne Special Forces Group - 12 teams are each attached to the Capital Mechanized Infantry Division and 9th Infantry Division
 2nd Marine Brigade (Blue Dragon)
 Navy Transportation Flotilla (White Sea Gull)
 UDT - attached to ROK Navy Transportation Flotilla
 Air Force Support Group (Silver Horse)

Operations involving South Korea
 Battle of Bong Son
 Battle of Trà Bình
 Battle of Đức Cơ
 Operation Hong Kil Dong

Media
In 1992, Korean film director Chung Ji-young directed a War film titled White Badge. It follows two veterans who fought in the Vietnam War and had seen the horrors of war through a series of flashbacks. 2004 horror war film R-Point depicts a squad of eight soldiers tasked with extracting a missing platoon that was sent to R-Point in an abandoned French plantation, only to find out that the building is being haunted by the spirits of the deceased. In 2008, Lee Joon-ik produced a drama war film titled Sunny which follows a young woman who joins a band in order to find her husband who is sent off fighting in Vietnam. 2020 TV drama It's Okay to Not Be Okay, the PTSD patient and veteran named Gan Pil-ong was depicted. He expressed his remorse for obeying his superior's orders to massacre innocent Vietnamese children.

See also
 MACV
 Republic of China in the Vietnam War
 New Zealand in the Vietnam War
 Military history of Australia during the Vietnam War
 Canada and the Vietnam War
 North Korea in the Vietnam War

References

External links
 Vietnam Veterans Association Korea

Anti-communism in South Korea
Vietnam
Vietnam
Vietnam War
Vietnam
 
South Korea–South Vietnam relations